DVBViewer is proprietary, commercial software for viewing & recording of DVB TV & Radio using a TV tuner card or box and a Media Center for viewing Music, Video and Pictures. Among its other features are an Electronic Program Guide (EPG), remote control support, on-screen display, teletext, time shifting and picture-in-picture. Besides the support for BDA adapters, there is also the ability to use the Hauppauge MediaMVP with DVBViewer. The software also allows Unicable, DiSEqC and usage of CI-Modules with most adapters. The worldwide charge for the application is 15 euro or 22 US Dollars. Additional functions such as video on demand, TV series and movie management, home network distribution of TV to network devices including iPod Touch, iPhone & iPad & Android devices (with additional remote control features), and a recording service with web interface are provided by free plugins. A plug-in offering MHEG-5 and HbbTV support is available for a license fee of 12 euros.

DVBViewer was the first windows application with HDTV support, right after the Euro 1080 started its transmission via satellite. It also was one of the first alternative applications supporting the DVB-S2 broadcast standard and being compatible to most tuner cards supporting this standard using BDA, a standardized driver interface for digital video capture developed by Microsoft. Therefore, it presented itself as a valuable replacement for the manufacturers bundled software, often only providing fundamental functionality.
The current version allows the use of Sat>IP on the client- and also on the server side.

Editions 
There are three editions of the DVBViewer available, an OEM edition, a commercial one, DVBViewer Pro and an alternative edition, DVBViewer GE, mainly aimed at German speaking customers of the commercial edition. 
An OEM edition is included with products by various manufacturers: 
TechniSat DVBViewer TE & TE2
TerraTec DVBViewer Terratec Edition
TechnoTrend TT Viewer
Digital Everywhere
DVBSky
Turbosight
DVBShop
RF Central.

Reviews
A comprehensive review (in German) of the software can be found at DVBMagic, or in English in the UK's best selling computer magazine, Computeractive. DVBViewer is also mentioned in 16 hardware reviews on techradar, Future plc's UK Tech magazine.

References

External links 
 Official Website
 DVBViewer Wiki

Video recording software
Digital television software
Television placeshifting technology
Pascal (programming language) software